Live Cream Volume II is the second live album by the British rock band Cream, released in March 1972 by Polydor Records (Atco Records in the US). This album contains six tracks recorded at various performances from 9 March to 4 October 1968.

Reception
Matthew Greenwald of AllMusic stated that Volume 2 had more songs on it than its predecessor, including two songs whose album versions were released as singles. He also commented on how the sound quality was some of the best at the time. He did not like, however, that there were not as many extended jams as there were on the predecessor and that Jack Bruce and Eric Clapton's singing is not good on "White Room" and "Sunshine of Your Love." Greenwald felt that the live version of "Deserted Cities of the Heart" is better than the studio version.

"Steppin' Out" was used in the dramatic climax of Mean Streets (1973) directed by Martin Scorsese.

Track listing

Personnel
''Per liner notes
Eric Clapton – vocals, guitar
Jack Bruce – vocals, bass, harmonica
Ginger Baker – drums
Felix Pappalardi – producer
Tom Dowd – recording engineer
Bill Halverson – recording engineer
Gene Paul – re-mix engineer
Kevin Brady – re-mix engineer
Jim Marshall – cover photography
Gene Trindl – backliner photography
Stanisław Zagórski – album design

Charts

References

Cream (band) live albums
1972 live albums
Polydor Records live albums
Albums produced by Felix Pappalardi